Unity Systems was a home automation company that was based in Redwood City, California and was formed in 1983. In 1985, Unity Systems released the Unity Home Manager which was one of the earliest home automation systems as well as one of the most successful systems. It featured a green monochrome touchscreen display with options such as temperature settings, floor plans, lighting control, the sprinkler system, HVAC control, security and general maintenance settings. The Unity Home Manager was sold by a dealer network which consisted of small, and dedicated companies, with around 90 dealers across the United States at a point in time. Unity systems closed its doors in 1999.

See also

 Home automation for the elderly and disabled
 Internet of Things
 List of home automation software and hardware
 List of home automation topics
 List of network buses
 Smart device
 Web of Things

References

Home automation companies
Building engineering organizations